Amestris (Amēstris, perhaps the same as Άμαστρις, Amāstris, from Old Persian Amāstrī-, "strong woman"; died c. 424 BC) was a Persian queen, the wife of Xerxes I of Persia, mother of Achaemenid King of Kings Artaxerxes I of Persia.
 
She was poorly regarded by ancient Greek historians.

Life
Amestris was the daughter of Otanes, one of the seven noblemen reputed to have killed the magus who was impersonating King Bardiya in 522 BC. After this, Darius I the Great of Persia assumed the throne. According to Herodotus, Otanes was honoured with royal marriages. Darius I married Otanes' daughter Phaedymia while Otanes married a sister of Darius, who gave birth to Amestris.

When Darius died in 486 BC, Amestris was married to the crown prince, Xerxes. Herodotus describes Amestris as a cruel despot:

The origin of this story is unclear, since known records and accounts indicate that human sacrifices were not permitted within the Persian religion. Also since most accounts of the time are from Greek sources, and due to the involvement of Greece as an opponent of Persia, it is possible that not all accounts are accurate.

Circa 478 BC, her son Crown Prince Darius was married to his cousin Artaynte at Sardis. She was the daughter of Xerxes' brother Masistes. At the behest of Xerxes, Artaynte committed adultery with him (Xerxes). When Amestris found out, she did not seek revenge against Artaynte, but against her mother, Masistes' wife, as Amestris thought that it was her connivance. On Xerxes' birthday, Amestris sent for his guards and mutilated Masistes' wife by cutting off her breasts and threw them to dogs, and her nose and ears and lips also, and cutting out her tongue as well. On seeing this, Masistes fled to Bactria to start a revolt, but was intercepted by Xerxes' army who killed him and his sons.

Popular depictions 

The anime and manga series Fullmetal Alchemist features the fictional country of Amestris. 400 years prior to the start of the show, there existed a country known as Xerxes.

Amestris is a character in the opera Serse by George Frideric Handel (italianized as "Amastre"). In the opera, Amestris is about to marry Xerxes (Serse), yet he falls in love with another woman and wants to marry her instead. Amestris disguises herself as a man in order to be near him. At the end of the opera, Xerxes is sorry for the things he did and asks Amestris once more to be his wife.

Notes

Sources 
 Amestris by Jona Lendering

5th-century BC women
6th-century BC births
5th-century BC deaths
Queens of the Achaemenid Empire
Babylonian captivity
5th-century BC Iranian people